John Earle (1824–1903) was a British Anglo-Saxon language scholar. He was twice Rawlinsonian Professor of Anglo-Saxon in the University of Oxford.

Earle wrote more than a dozen books and was the author of Two Saxon Chronicles Parallel (1865), and Anglo-Saxon Literature (1884). Charles Plummer edited Earle's Two Saxon Chronicles Parallel, producing a Revised Text with notes, appendices, and glossary in 1892.

Milestones in his life
Earle was born at Elston, Churchstow, S. Devon, on 29 January 1824, the oldest son of John Earle who was a farmer and landowner. Earle was educated at Oriel College, Oxford, where he obtained first-class honors in classics. Earle was elected a fellow in 1848 and in 1857 became rector of Swanswick, near Bath. In 1863, he married Jane Rolleston, the daughter of Rev. George Rolleston (rector and squire of Maltby, W. Riding, father of George Rolleston). Earle became a prebendary of Wells, which was a small cathedral city of Somerset, in 1871. His recreations were boating, riding and gardening.

Earle held the position of Professor of Anglo-Saxon at Oxford as well as the rectory of Swanswick until his death in 1903. His address in the 1903 Who's Who (UK) is listed as Swanswick Rectory, Bath, 84 Banbury Road, Oxford.

Positions held

Fellow of Oriel, 1848
College Tutor, 1852
Rector of Swanswick (near Bath) 1857
Rawlinson and Bosworth Professor of Anglo-Saxon 1849–1854
Rawlinson and Bosworth Professor of Anglo-Saxon 1876–1903
Prebendary of Wells since 1871
Select Preacher, Oxford University, 1873-1874
Rural Dean of Bath, 1873-1877

Bibliography
Gloucester Fragments of St. Swithun (1861)
Bath, Ancient and Modern (1864)
Two Saxon Chronicles Parallel (1865)
The Philology of the English Tongue (1871)
A Book for the Beginner in Anglo-Saxon (1877)
English Plant Names from the Tenth to the Fifteenth Century (1880)
Anglo-Saxon Literature (1884)
A Handbook to the Land Charters (1888)
English Prose: its Elements, History, and Usage (1890)
The Deeds of Beowulf (1892)
The Psalter of 1539 (1894)
A Simple Grammar of English Now in Use (1898)
The Alfred Jewel: an Historical Essay (1901)

References

External links 
 
 

1824 births
1903 deaths
Anglo-Saxon studies scholars
Translators from Old English
Linguists from England
Alumni of Oriel College, Oxford
Rawlinsonian Professors of Anglo-Saxon
19th-century translators
Rolleston family